2022 Santa Clara County Board of Supervisors election was held on November 8, 2022. Two of the five seats on the Santa Clara County Board of Supervisors were up for election. District 1 was an open seat due to the terming out of Supervisor Mike Wasserman. The was highly competitive and the first since the 2020 United States redistricting cycle which changed the boundaries of the District. Since District 4 was uncontested, incumbent Supervisor Susan Ellenberg did not appear on the November 8th ballot.

Background 
Santa Clara County is the 18th largest county in the United States and the 6th largest in the State of California. All local elections in the State of California are officially nonpartisan and use a top-two primary system; if no candidate receives a majority of the June 7, 2022 vote, a runoff will be held between the top two candidates on November 8, 2022. In the redistricting process, the district lines were changed during a contentious process in which one of the candidates, Johnny Khamis, threatened to sue for alleged Gerrymandering.

Primary candidates

District 1 
Sylvia Arenas - Member of the San Jose City Council representing District 8

Johnny Khamis - Former member of the San Jose City Council, represented District 10

Claudia Rossi - Registered Nurse, Member of the Santa Clara County Board of Education

Rich Constantine - Mayor of Morgan Hill, California

Denelle Fedor- Nonprofit case manager, former political staffer

District 4 
Susan Ellenberg - Incumbent, current Santa Clara County Supervisor .

Results

District 1

District 4

References 

2022 California elections
Local elections in California
2022 United States local elections
Government of Santa Clara County, California